The Grammy Award for Best Song Written for Visual Media (including its previous names) is the Grammy Awards awarded to songs written for films, television, video games or other visual media.

Recipients

 Each year is linked to the article about the Grammy Awards held that year.
 The performing artist is only listed but does not receive the award.

Superlatives 
The following nominees have earned at least two wins and nominations:

Nominations

Multiple wins

Name changes
 1988–1999: The Grammy Award for Best Song Written Specifically for a Motion Picture or for Television
 2000–2011: The Grammy Award for Best Song Written for a Motion Picture, Television or Other Visual Media
 2012–present: The Grammy Award for Best Song Written for Visual Media

Notes

References

Song Written for a Motion Picture, Television or Other Visual Media
 
Awards established in 1988
Film awards for Best Song
Songwriting awards